KIIX (1410 AM) is a radio station broadcasting a Classic Country format. Licensed to Fort Collins, Colorado, United States, it serves the Ft. Collins-Greeley area.  The station is owned by iHeartMedia, Inc., who acquired the station from Jacor in May 1999.

History

The station was originally licensed, as KCOL, in 1947 on 1400 kHz. It moved to 1410 kHz in 1950.

Expanded Band assignment

On March 17, 1997, the Federal Communications Commission (FCC) announced that eighty-eight stations had been given permission to move to newly available "Expanded Band" transmitting frequencies, ranging from 1610 to 1700 kHz, with KCOL authorized to move from 1410 to 1670 kHz. However, the station never procured the Construction Permit needed to implement the authorization, so the expanded band station was never built.

Later history

The call letters were changed to KIIX on November 5, 1999. The station aired the America's Best Music format syndicated by Dial Global until a format change to Classic Country on April 2, 2012.

References

External links

FCC History Cards for KIIX  (covering 1946-1981 as KCOL)
 KIIX AM 1410 Official Site
 https://web.archive.org/web/20081220103933/http://kiix.off.co.il/

IIX
Adult standards radio stations in the United States
Radio stations established in 1947
1947 establishments in Colorado
IHeartMedia radio stations